Myslim Pashaj (born 1945) is a retired colonel and retired head of cartographic center of Albania. He was one of the main opposers of the Albanian-Greek Sea border pact, which he called a loss of Albanian territory. He won the case in the Constitutional Court of Albania. He got blackmailed and some people claimed they would kill him for opposing the pact.

Pashaj was the general secretary of the Red and Black Alliance and declared irrevocable resignation on 13 May.

References

Albanian military personnel
Living people
Red and Black Alliance politicians
1945 births